Najafabad (also Romanized as Najafābād; also known as Najīfābād) is a village in Siyavashan Rural District, in the Central District of Ashtian County, Markazi Province, Iran. At the 2005 census, its population was 213, in 76 families.

References 

Populated places in Ashtian County